Richard Bowker may refer to:
 Richard Bowker (Australian businessman) (1815–1903), Australian physician, surgeon and politician
 Richard Bowker (British businessman) (born 1966), former chief executive of National Express Group and former chairman and chief executive of the Strategic Rail Authority
 Richard Rogers Bowker (1848–1933), American journalist and founder of the R.R. Bowker Company
 Richard Bowker (writer) (born 1950), American writer of crime and science fiction